2 Scorpii (A Scorpii) is a double star in the southern zodiac constellation of Scorpius. The brighter component has an apparent visual magnitude of 4.69, which is bright enough to be visible to the naked eye, while the fainter star is of magnitude 6.98. This is a probable (73% chance) member of the Lower Centaurus–Crux group of the nearby Scorpius–Centaurus association (Sco OB2), or else (27% chance) it is a member of the Gould's Belt.

With high likelihood (>95%), this is a binary star system. The brighter member, component A, is a B-type main-sequence star with a stellar classification of B2.5 Vn. The 'n' suffix indicates broad (nebulous) absorption lines due to rapid rotation. It is spinning with a projected rotational velocity of 320 km/s, giving the star an oblate shape with an equatorial bulge that is 15% larger than the polar radius. Roughly 30 million years old, it has an estimated 6.9 times the mass of the Sun and is radiating 457 times the Sun's luminosity from its photosphere at an effective temperature of 20,350 K.

References

External links
deepskypedia.com/wiki/2_Scorpii
www.wolframalpha.com/input/?i=2+Scorpii

B-type main-sequence stars
Double stars
Scorpius (constellation)
Scorpii, A
Durchmusterung objects
Scorpii, 02
142114
077840
5904